Alleluya Rosette Ikote is a Ugandan politician and former Member of Parliament. She was the Woman Representative for Pallisa District in the National Resistance Council (1989–1996) and a Member of Parliament (1997–2001) for the same constituency in Uganda's sixth parliament.

Career

Politics 
Ikote contested in the 1989 Ugandan general election and was the Woman Representative for Pallisa District on the 1989 National Resistance Council (NRC). Later on, affiliated to the National Resistance Movement (NRM), she contested in the 1996 Ugandan parliamentary election and represented the same constituency in Uganda's sixth parliament (1997–2001)

She was replaced by Jennifer Namuyangu who defeated her in the 2001 Ugandan parliamentary elections.

Post-politics 
Ikote worked in Nairobi as the Executive Director of Amani Forum.

She was later appointed the Governance Programme Manager of the United Nations Development Programme (UNDP) in South Sudan.

See also 

 Parliament of Uganda
 Jenipher Namuyangu

References 

Living people
People from Pallisa District
Ugandan women
Members of the Parliament of Uganda
Year of birth missing (living people)
Women members of the Parliament of Uganda
National Resistance Movement politicians